Eupithecia tricuspis is a moth in the family Geometridae. It is found in Uganda and possibly Tanzania.

References

Moths described in 1932
tricuspis
Insects of Uganda
Insects of Tanzania
Moths of Africa